Morgan Gallagher (born 4 October 1997) is a field hockey player from Australia.

Personal life
Morgan Gallagher was born and raised in Brisbane, Queensland.

Career

Domestic league
In Hockey Australia's domestic league, the Sultana Bran Hockey One, Gallagher is a member of the Brisbane Blaze. In 2019 she was a member of the premiership winning Brisbane Blaze team in the league's inaugural season.

Under–21
Gallagher made her junior international debut in 2018 during a test series against New Zealand in Hawke's Bay.

Hockeyroos
In 2023, Gallagher was selected to make her debut for the Hockeyroos. She was named in the squad for a test series against China in Bunbury and Perth.

References

External links

1997 births
Living people
Australian female field hockey players
Female field hockey midfielders
People from Brisbane